"O.P.P." is a song by American hip hop group Naughty by Nature, released in August 1991 as the lead single from their self-titled second album, Naughty by Nature (1991). It was one of the first rap songs to become a pop hit when it reached No. 6 on the US Billboard Hot 100 and No. 35 on the UK Singles Chart. Its declaration, "Down wit' O.P.P", was a popular catchphrase in the US in the early 1990s. David Bellochio aka "Dave Drop a Load on Em" appears in the video and played and programmed all the keyboard and drum parts at his studio Marion Recording Studios in Fairview, NJ. Van Romaine overdubbed live drums there as well. 

The song was a hugely successful single; Spin magazine named it one of the greatest singles of the 1990s, offering a brief verdict with the rhetorical question, "Ever wonder where Puffy came from?" It also made some media outlets' lists of one of the best rap songs of all time: including The Source, VH1 (No. 22), and  Rolling Stone (No. 80). The song was also ranked No. 20 on VH1's "40 Greatest Hip Hop Songs of the '90s".

Content
The song samples Melvin Bliss' "Synthetic Substitution" and The Jackson 5's "ABC". Its lyrics concern sexual infidelity, with "O.P.P." standing for "other people's pussy" and "other people's penis". Treach told in an interview with New York Times, "'O.P.P.' is about crazy messing with other people's girls. Everybody knows about that, girls messing, guys messing, you know the bit. It goes on, so everybody could relate, the fellas and the girls, and it's got a hook for the party and everybody can crazy groove to it."

Critical reception
Upon the single release, Larry Flick from Billboard remarked that here, the act drops samples of the Jackson Five's "ABC" onto "a rousing hip-hop beat-base. Anthemic rhymes are icing on the cake. Have a taste." James Bernard from Entertainment Weekly described it as "a sly, body-rocking tune with a melodic pop hook and plenty of cute double entendres". Dennis Hunt from Los Angeles Times viewed it as a "lively, lewd hit single", "which is cleverly constructed on the framework of the Jackson 5’s bubble-gum soul classic". A reviewer from Music & Media felt "It's further proof of the new direction in rap heading more towards a normal pop song. The combination of the piano hook and the female backup makes this funky rhyme memorable." 

Peter Watrous from New York Times wrote, "There are a couple of signs that "O.P.P.", an old-fashioned cheating song by Naughty by Nature [...] is shaping up as one of the summer's hits on local streets. The first indication is the sound of "O.P.P" coming from the back of Jeeps; the second is that bootleg T-shirts advertising the band -- Trech (Trech Criss), Vin Rock (Vinnie Brown) and Kay Gee (Keir Gist) -- are being sold all over lower Manhattan." Johnny Lee from Smash Hits declared the song as "everso jumpy". Scott Poulson-Bryant from Spin said, "I'm definitely down with "O.P.P."—you will be too."

Retrospective response
In an 2021 retrospective review, Jesse Ducker from Albumism said about "O.P.P.", "It's one of the most light-hearted songs about infidelity this side of Clarence Carter's "Back Door Santa", as Treach gleefully lists the virtues of engaging in sexual congress with someone else's girl." Stanton Swihart of AllMusic felt it's "a song that somehow managed the trick of being both audaciously catchy and subversively coy at the same time." He added, "Its irrepressible appeal was so widespread, in fact, that it played just as well to the hardcore heads in the hood as it did to the hip-hop dabblers in the suburbs." Jean Rosenbluth from Los Angeles Times stated, "The fabulously wicked chant "O.P.P." masterfully captured hip-hop's silly side even better than that genre's prime exponent, Digital Underground."

Music video
A music video was produced to promote the single, directed by Rodd Houston and Marcus Raboy. It begins with a man removing his wedding ring and dropping it. The group raps at a club behind a fence and people dance behind them. The video was later published on Naughty by Nature's official YouTube channel on July 13, 2010, and had generated more than 19 million views as of January 2023.

Track listing
 "O.P.P." (Vocal)
 "Wickedest Man Alive" (Vocal)
 "O.P.P." (Sunny Days Remix)
 "Wickedest Man Alive" (Instrumental)
 "O.P.P." (Instrumental)

Official versions
 "O.P.P." (Album Version)
 "O.P.P." (Vocal)
 "O.P.P." (Instrumental)
 "O.P.P." (Sunny Days Remix)

Charts

Weekly charts

Year-end charts

In popular culture
The song has been used as a soundtrack to various films as well as television series, including the TV sitcoms The Fresh Prince of Bel-Air and The Office, and the films La Haine, Jarhead, and Up in the Air. In the film Sister Act 2: Back In The Habit, the song was parodied as 'Down With G.O.D'. In the video game Minecraft, the phrase "Down with O.P.P.!" was used as a splash text which appeared on the game's menu screen. The splash was added on February 7, 2010 in Java Edition version Indev 20100207-1 but was later removed in version 1.16 Release Candidate 1 on June 18, 2020.

References

1991 singles
Songs written by Berry Gordy
Songs written by Freddie Perren
Naughty by Nature songs
Music videos directed by Marcus Raboy
Songs written by Deke Richards
Songs written by Alphonzo Mizell
1991 songs
Songs written by Treach
Songs written by KayGee
Songs written by Vin Rock
Tommy Boy Records singles
Song recordings produced by Naughty by Nature
Songs about infidelity